The 1997–98 Magyar Kupa (English: Hungarian Cup) was the 59th season of Hungary's annual knock-out cup football competition.

Quarter-finals

|}

Semi-finals

|}

Final

See also
 1997–98 Nemzeti Bajnokság I

References

External links
 Official site 
 soccerway.com

1997–98 in Hungarian football
1997–98 domestic association football cups
1997-98